Zachariah Keodirelang "ZK" Matthews (20 October 1901 – 11 May 1968) was a prominent black academic in South Africa, lecturing at South African Native College (renamed University of Fort Hare in 1955), where many future leaders of the African continent were among his students.

Life

Early years
Z.K. Matthews was born in Winter's Rush near Kimberley in 1901, the son of a Bamangwato mineworker. Z.K. grew up in urban Kimberley, but maintained close connections with his mother’s rural Barolong relatives. He went to Mission high school in the eastern Cape where he attended Lovedale. After Lovedale he studied at South African Native College in Fort Hare, and in 1923 he wrote the external examination of the University of South Africa.

In 1924, he was appointed head of the high school at Adams College in Natal,  where Albert Luthuli was also a teacher. With Luthuli he attended meetings of the Durban Joint Council and held office in the Natal Teacher’s Association, of which he eventually became President.

It was while he was in Natal, in 1928, that he married Frieda Bokwe, daughter of John Knox Bokwe, whom he had met as a student at Fort Hare. Their son, Joe, was born in 1929 in Durban.

In 1930, after private study, Matthews earned an LLB degree in South Africa, a degree he was awarded once again by the University of South Africa. He was admitted as an attorney and practiced for a short time in Alice. In 1933, he was invited to study at Yale University in the United States, and there in the following year he completed an MA. He then went on to spend a year at the London School of Economics where he studied anthropology under Bronisław Malinowski.

He returned to South Africa in 1935 and in 1936 was appointed Lecturer in Social Anthropology and Native Law and Administration at University of Fort Hare. After Davidson Don Tengo Jabavu’s retirement in 1944, Matthews was promoted to Professor and became head of Fort Hare’s Department of African Studies.

Political activism

Matthews did not confine himself to academic studies; he combined his study of anthropology and the law with an active political involvement. He found his true political home in the ANC. He had attended meetings as a boy in the company of Sol Plaatje, a senior relative, but it was only in 1940 that he became a member of the organisation. In 1943, he was elected to the National Executive Committee and at the same time he became a member of the Native Representative Council, a purely advisory body that has been condemned as a “toy telephone” and which Z.K. found generally frustrating, although he found dealing with the Native Education Act of 1945 a “valuable experience” not for the process but for the people he met. In June 1949, Matthews succeeded James Calata as ANC provincial president in the Cape.

In June 1952, on the eve of the Defiance Campaign, he left South Africa, and took up a position as visiting professor at New York’s Union Theological Seminary.

He returned home in May 1953, and although not present at the Congress of the People in 1955, he assisted Lionel "Rusty" Bernstein in drawing up the Freedom Charter that was adopted there. Denis Goldberg credits him with being one of the driving forces behind the proposal for gathering and documenting the wishes of the people for the Charter.

Matthews was arrested in December 1956 and was one of the accused in the Treason Trial. On his release from the trial in late 1958, he returned to Fort Hare, but resigned his post in protest against the passing of legislation that reduced the university to an ethnic college for the Xhosa community only.

In 1961, he moved to Geneva to become secretary of the Africa division of the World Council of Churches.

In 1966, he accepted the post of newly formed Botswana ambassador to the United States and he died there in Washington on 11 May 1968.

Selected publications
A New Native Teachers' Course, Ilanga lase Natal, November 4, 11, 1927
Bantu Law and Western Civilisation in South Africa: A Study in the Clash of Cultures  Yale University, 1934. Master of Arts thesis.
A Short History of the Tshidi Barolong, Fort Hare Papers, vol. 1 no. 1, June 1945
Foreword, in Responsible Government in a Revolutionary Age, [ed.] Z. K. Matthews, Association Press, New York, 1966.
Freedom For My People, Cape Town: Collings, 1981. (Published posthumously in 1981)
Africa holds her own. An appreciation of Bantu tribal and national culture in the Imperial Protectorates and in the Union of South Africa. By W. Bryant Mumford. in co-operation with Hugh Ashton . [and] Z.K. Matthews.
African awakening and the universities, Cape Town University of Cape Town, 1961.

See also
 Joe Matthews
 Naledi Pandor
 Temba Maqubela

References

External links
Short Biography

1901 births
1968 deaths
People from Dikgatlong Local Municipality
Cape Colony people
South African Tswana people
African National Congress politicians
Alumni of the London School of Economics
Anti-apartheid activists
People acquitted of treason
South African prisoners and detainees
Prisoners and detainees of South Africa
Ambassadors of Botswana to the United States
South African anthropologists
Academic staff of the University of Fort Hare
Members of the Order of Luthuli
20th-century anthropologists
 The African Activist Archive Project includes  Interview with Professor Z. K. Matthews by George M. Houser in South Africa in September 1954.